Warsaw Historic District is a national historic district located at Warsaw, Duplin County, North Carolina. The district encompasses 55 contributing buildings and 1 contributing structure in the central business district and surrounding residential area of Warsaw. It includes residential and commercial buildings with notable examples of Queen Anne and Classical Revival style architecture.  Notable buildings include the Warsaw Inn (1909), Barden Hotel (c. 1908), Kennedy-Middleton House (1885), L.P. Best House (1894), Henry L. Stevens House (1897), and Warsaw Presbyterian Church (1884).

It was added to the National Register of Historic Places in 1996.

References

Historic districts on the National Register of Historic Places in North Carolina
Queen Anne architecture in North Carolina
Neoclassical architecture in North Carolina
Buildings and structures in Duplin County, North Carolina
National Register of Historic Places in Duplin County, North Carolina